Empangeni is a city in KwaZulu-Natal, South Africa. It is approximately 157 kilometres north of Durban, in hilly countryside, overlooking a flat coastal plain and the major harbour town of Richards Bay 16 kilometres away. The N2 freeway runs east from Empangeni intersecting John Ross Highway (R34) which connects Empangeni and Richards Bay.

The climate is sub-tropical with an average temperature of 28.4 °C in summer and 14.5 °C in Winter. The town is said, by local residents, to not have a real winter, as temperatures are seldom very low.

History

Humble beginnings
In 1851, the Norwegian Missionary Society established a mission station on the banks of the eMpangeni river. The river was named after the profusion of Mpange trees (Trema guineensis) growing along its banks. The mission was later moved to Eshowe, 61 kilometres north-west. In 1894 a magistracy was established. The Zululand Railway reached the town in January 1903 and linked the area to Durban and Eshowe. The government planted eucalyptus trees in 1905 as part of an experimental timber plantation. The plantation was a success and led to a large scale planting along the coastal belt. In 1906 Empangeni became a village. Rapid expansion began when a sugar mill was erected at Felixton. The establishment of the Empangeni Sugar Mill set the area on the road to rapid development. Empangeni was officially proclaimed as a township on 15 January 1931 and declared a borough on 13 October 1960.

The reign of the Hammerman
A small town, Empangeni made the headlines in the early 1980's for a very unfortunate reason. Serial killer Simon Mpungose was terrorising the citizens of Empangeni during his spree of violent murders. The 35-year-old Mpungose was given the name ‘Hammerman’ because he would break into homes in the dead of night and kill the occupants with a hammer before robbing them of their possessions. When he was brought to trial in November 1984, shortly after his arrest that same year, the Empangeni court was told that Mpungose attacked many other people during violent robberies, but never touched the children of his victims. During the trial Mpungose stated that he wanted to die as he had a hard life, complicated by the actions of people who did not understand his plight.

He sentenced him to hang, whereupon Mpungose threw his blue tracksuit into the public gallery, shouted, and threatened to expose his penis to the court before he was restrained with handcuffs. He was hanged a year later on Friday, 29 November 1985 in Pretoria.

The Riots of 2021
Empangeni was one of the town severely damaged during the riots and subsequent looting that broke out in parts of South Africa during July 2021. Many businesses did not reopen following the carnage.

Education
Empangeni has a number of respected schools.

High schools
 Empangeni High School {EHS}
 Mevamhlophe High School
 St Catherine's Empangeni
 Old Mill High School {OMS}
 Richem Secondary 
 Felixton College 
 Khombindlela High School {KHS}
 Ehawini Technical High School
 Thanduyise High School
 Nongweleza High School
 Amangwe High School
 Matshana High School

Primary schools
 Grantham Park
 Heuwelland
 Empangeni Preparatory School
 Empangeni Educare Centre
 Empangeni Christian School
 Phesheya Primary school
Thembelihle Primary school
 Nqutshini Primary School
 Wood and Raw Primary School
 Siyakhanyisa Primary School
 Ngweni Primary School

Religion
Empangeni is home to a number of faiths, including Christian, Muslim, and Jehovah's Witness. Christianity is the dominant faith in Empangeni with a large number or operating church, amongst them are Christian Family Church, The Redeemed Christian Church of God, Empangeni Methodist Church, AGS Empangeni, Victory Family Church, Full Gospel Church, Lutheran Church, Solid Ground Church, Empangeni Baptist Church, Uniting Reformed Church (Dutch), the Catholic Church, Holy cross and St Thomas in Felixton.

Sports
Empangeni has a strong sporting community, most of whom participate in one or more of these sports:
 Golf
 Rugby
 Squash
 Pool
 Bowls
 Cricket
 Soccer
 Hockey

Notable people
Vincent Koch, rugby player
Mildred Oliphant, politician
Ian Vermaak, tennis player
Muzi, musician
Schalk Brits, Rugby World Cup winning hooker
Matthew Mole, musician
sfiso Nene, Comedian
Mthandeni Mbambo,International Actor
Wiwi Gumede, Politician
Mthobisi Mtshali, Politician
Nathi Mthiyane, Football Star

Local media
 The Zululand Observer newspaper
 Icora FM community radio station
 Ikalamva Films
 Vibe Online

Ngwelezane township 
Ngwelezane is a township at the outskirts of Empangeni. The township is home to the Ngwelezane Hospital, a 554 beds institution and a tertiary hospital. 

It is also home of prominent influential people,the likes of Minister of Water and Sanitation Senzo Mchunu, Former Minister of Labour Mildred Oliphant, the late former Chairman of Eskom Ben Ngubane, Actress and film director Wendy Gumede, International Actor Mthandeni Mbambo, International Artist Muzi, Social Activists Wiwi Gumede, Mthobisi Mtshali and Social Entrepreneur Mpendulo Mbulawa.

Ngwelezane offers one of the best nightlife experiences through hosting events at its prominent restaurants and taverns. Ngwelezane is known for it tranquility.

In 2020 Residents joined forces to form a Green committee called "The Green Champions" which consists of young energetic patriotic members of the community led by Siyamthanda Community Services. The Green Champions spearheads the greening of Ngwelezane Township through their weekly "Adopt A Spot" campaign, where they turn illegal dumping spots and bushy neglected spaces into Green Spaces.

References

External links

Populated places in the uMhlathuze Local Municipality
Populated places established in 1851
1851 establishments in South Africa